Lewis Kaplan may refer to:
Lewis Kaplan, violinist
Lewis A. Kaplan, American judge

See also 
 Louis Kaplan (disambiguation)